Starobiryuchevo (İśke Büres) is a rural locality (a village) in Starobedeyevsky Selsoviet, Nurimanovsky District, Bashkortostan, Russia. The population was 193 as of 2010. There are 4 streets.

Geography 
Starobiryuchevo is located 82 km northwest of Krasnaya Gorka (the district's administrative centre) by road. Novobiryuchevo is the nearest rural locality.

References 

Rural localities in Nurimanovsky District